Wuthipong Sitthithunkij (born January 26, 1988), simply known as Wut, is a professional footballer from Bangkok, Thailand. He currently plays for Ubon UMT United  in the Thai Division 1 League.

Clubs 

Senior

Honor

Club
Ubon UMT United

Regional League Division 2:
Winners : 2015
Regional League North-East Division
 Runner-up : 2015

International

References

1988 births
Living people
Wuthipong Sitthithunkij
Wuthipong Sitthithunkij
Association football midfielders
Wuthipong Sitthithunkij
Wuthipong Sitthithunkij
Wuthipong Sitthithunkij
Wuthipong Sitthithunkij